Márton Kálmáncsehi Sánta, also known as Martin Kálmáncsehi (Kálmáncsa, 1500 – Debrecen, December 1550), was the first pastor to publicly preach Calvinist ideas in Hungary (in the 1540s). He began his church career as a canon at the Roman Catholic Diocese of Transylvania. He studied the theological works of Philip Melanchthon and Heinrich Bullinger. He succeeded the prominent reformator, Mátyás Dévai Bíró, as the Protestant town pastor of Debrecen in 1551.

References

Sources

1500 births
1550 deaths
16th-century Hungarian people
Protestant Reformers